The Galt Red Wings were a Canadian junior ice hockey team based in Galt, Ontario, now a part of the city of Cambridge. They played in the Ontario Hockey Association (OHA) from 1944 to 1947 and were operated as an affiliate of the Detroit Red Wings. Their home arena was the Galt Arena Gardens.

History
The team was previously the Galt Canadians during the 1943-44 season. The team gained NHL sponsorship, becoming the Galt Red Wings. The sponsorship lasted for three seasons, with Galt finishing near the top of the league each year. New ownership renamed the team the Galt Rockets in 1947. Much of the team's success was due to its coach, Al Murray, who guided the team  during its first three years. Murray had played in the NHL with the New York Americans.

During the 1944-45 season, future Hockey Hall of Famer Gordie Howe suited up for the team, but only played in one regular-season game due to league rules. That game occurred in Galt, before 1,848 fans on Saturday, Nov. 18, 1944 against Hamilton; Howe scored three points. This has become somewhat of a historical footnote as Howe was deemed ineligible to play for the team following that game. Howe's only points in Galt were thrown out when Hamilton withdrew from the league. A day after that Hamilton game it was reported that both Howe and teammate Terry Cavanagh (later mayor of Edmonton) would he ineligible to play until further notice after their transfers were held up. Howe explained what happened next. "Terry got his (transfer) and I never did. Hamilton got thrown out of the league, and I did too."

The Galt Red Wings reached the league finals for the J. Ross Robertson Cup in 1945 and 1947, but lost to Toronto St. Michael's Majors both times in four consecutive games.

Under coach Normie Himes, another former NHLer with the New York Americans, the Red Wings returned to the  finals again in 1946-47, led by future Hall of Fame goaltender, Terry Sawchuk, but lost the finals again in four games to the Majors.

In 1947, Lloyd Pollock who owned the Windsor Spitfires, convinced the Detroit Red Wings to relocate prospect players from Galt to Windsor.

NHL alumni
From the Galt Red Wings, fourteen players graduated to play in the National Hockey League.

 Pete Babando
 Pete Conacher
 Lee Fogolin
 Fred Glover
 Warren Godfrey
 Bronco Horvath
 Gordie Howe
 Tom McGrattan
 Marty Pavelich
 Nels Podolsky
 Jack Price
 Terry Sawchuk
 Barry Sullivan
 Bill Wylie

Yearly results

References

Notes

External links
 www.cambridgehockey.com - The History of Cambridge Hockey by Todd Jones
 Galt Arena Gardens - OHL Arena & Travel Guide
 Ontario Hockey League Official web site
 Canadian Hockey League Official web site

 
Sport in Cambridge, Ontario
Defunct Ontario Hockey League teams
Ice hockey clubs established in 1944
Ice hockey clubs disestablished in 1947
1944 establishments in Ontario
1947 disestablishments in Ontario
Detroit Red Wings minor league affiliates